The ICFAI Business School Hyderabad (IBS Hyderabad) is a business school in India. It was founded in 1995 and is located in Dontanapalli, Shankarpally Road, Hyderabad.

IBS Hyderabad is a constituent of the ICFAI Foundation for Higher Education (IFHE), a Deemed-to-be-University as per the UGC Act 1956. IBS Hyderabad is accredited by Association to Advance Collegiate Schools of Business (AACSB) in 2020.

History 
IBS Hyderabad was established in 1995. It is promoted by the ICFAI Group. Institute of Chartered Financial Analysts of India (ICFAI) is a not-for-profit educational society founded by N.J. Yasaswy, Besant C. Raj and Dr. Prasanna Chandra in the year 1984. After the establishment of IFHE in 2008, IBS Hyderabad became its first constituent.

Programs 
The major programs offered at IBS Hyderabad are MBA, PhD and BBA. As of 2020, it is also the only institution in India that is offering AACSB-accredited programs at the undergraduate, post graduate and doctoral levels. IBS Hyderabad also offers a number of certificate courses in Management. ICFAI Business School (IBS) offered scholarship program worth 10 crores to students.

IBS Case Research Center 
IBS Hyderabad has adopted the case method of pedagogy. The IBS Case Research Center is a center of excellence at the institution. Led by Debapratim Purkayastha, the center has developed more than 6,500 case studies that are used in leading schools across the world. The center has a number of bestselling cases and regularly wins awards in international competitions. In 2020, number of bestselling cases from IBS was next only to that of Harvard Business School. In terms of awards won at The Case Centre since 2011, IBS Hyderabad was next only to Harvard Business School and INSEAD.

Accreditation and ranking 
IBS Hyderabad is accredited by the AACSB in 2020.

IBS Hyderabad is also SAQS (South Asian Quality Assurance System) accredited, an accreditation conferred by The Association of Management Development Institutions in South Asia (AMDISA), since 2006. 

The faculty of Management of IFHE, i.e. IBS Hyderabad, was ranked 25th by the National Institutional Ranking Framework (NIRF) management ranking in 2020.
 In 2018, it had obtained its highest rank of 22nd in NIRF.

References 

Higher education in India
Management education in India
Business education
1995 establishments in Andhra Pradesh
Educational institutions established in 1995